Warszawski, feminine: Warszawska is a Polish-language toponymic surname literally meaning "of/from Warsaw". It may by transliterated as Warshavsky / Warshavska, etc. 

Notable people with this surname include:
Adolf Warski (born Jerzy Warszawski; 1868–1937), Polish communist leader, journalist
Alexander Varshavsky (born 1946), Russian-American biochemist
Dawid Warszawski, pseudonym of Konstanty Gebert, Polish journalist and a Jewish activist
Deena Varshavskaya, American entrepreneur
Icchok Warszawski, pseudonym of Isaac Bashevis Singer (1903–1991), Polish-born Jewish-American writer in Yiddish
Israel and Roy Warshawsky, owners of JC Whitney, American retailer of aftermarket automotive parts and accessories 
Józef Warszawski (1903-1997), Polish philosopher
Mark Warshawsky (1848-1907), Yiddish-language folk poet and composer
Michel Warschawski ((Mikado) (born 1949), Israeli anti-Zionist activist
Mikhail Varshavski (born 1989), "Doctor Mike", American doctor and internet celebrity
Sergei Varshavsky (1906-1980), Russian writer and collector
Seth Warshavsky, (born 1973), American pioneer in the internet pornography industry
Stanislava Varshavski, Israeli-American piano player
V. I. Warshawski, fictional private investigator in novels and short stories by Sara Paretsky

See also 
Wachowski

Polish-language surnames
Polish toponymic surnames
Warsaw